Rundle Park is a municipal park in Edmonton, Canada, and a major park in the North Saskatchewan River Valley parks system. The park overlooks the North Saskatchewan River, and there is a pedestrian bridge that connects Gold Bar Park and Rundle Park together. The park features paved paths, sport amenities, and numerous ponds.

The Town of Beverly amalgamated with Edmonton in 1961, and portions of Rundle Park were formerly the Town of Beverly’s garbage dump.

Activities 
 Disc golf course, with holes dotted around the entire park. It was designed by Steve Mallett and Wally Ovalle in 1980 and later redesigned in 2009 by Steve Mallett. The course is available to the public at no charge, on a first-come, first-served, walk-on basis. It features concrete tee pads and Innova DISCatcher Pro targets.
 Swimming centre
 Green-asphalt tennis courts
 18-hole par 3 golf course
 Paddleboat rentals, available during the summer
 Soccer fields
 Baseball/softball diamonds
 Hiking trails
 Multi-use trails (paved)
 Tobogganing hill
 Public beach volleyball court

References 

Parks in Edmonton